Resurrection Manor was a historic home located near Hollywood, St. Mary's County, Maryland, United States.  It was built amidst a  farm granted to Thomas Cornwaleys in 1650.  It was an example of early brick architecture in the United States dating from about 1660 to 1720.  It was originally built as a one-room house with a steep stair leading to the garret.  A 1½-story addition was added to the house, transforming its footprint into a hall-and-parlor configuration.

Resurrection Manor was listed as a National Historic Landmark in 1970. In 2002, the house was demolished to make room for a single-family home; National Historic Landmark designation for Resurrection Manor was withdrawn on February 17, 2006.

See also
Maston House

References

External links

Historic American Buildings Survey in Maryland
Houses on the National Register of Historic Places in Maryland
Houses in St. Mary's County, Maryland
Hall and parlor houses
Former National Historic Landmarks of the United States
National Register of Historic Places in St. Mary's County, Maryland
Former National Register of Historic Places in Maryland